Valerio Cancellieri (died 1574) was a Roman Catholic prelate who served as Bishop of Sant'Angelo dei Lombardi e Bisaccia (1542–1574).

Biography
On 11 October 1542, Valerio Cancellieri was appointed during the papacy of Pope Paul III as Bishop of Sant'Angelo dei Lombardi e Bisaccia.
He served as Bishop of Sant'Angelo dei Lombardi e Bisaccia until his death in 1574.

References

External links and additional sources
 (for Chronology of Bishops) 
 (for Chronology of Bishops) 

16th-century Italian Roman Catholic bishops
Bishops appointed by Pope Paul III
1574 deaths
Archbishops of Sant'Angelo dei Lombardi-Conza-Nusco-Bisaccia